David Isaac, CBE is a British solicitor and Provost of Worcester College, Oxford, where he took office in July 2021. He was previously a partner at Pinsent Masons. He was appointed as the chair of the Equality and Human Rights Commission in 2016, serving in that capacity until August 2020. He is also chair of the Court of Governors at University of the Arts London (2018–present).  He was previously chair of Stonewall from 2003 to 2012. He was a director of the Diana Princess of Wales Memorial Fund (2005–2014), the Big Lottery Fund (2014–2018), Black Mountains College (2019–20) and a trustee of 14-18 NOW (2016–2019).

Isaac was appointed a CBE in the 2011 Queen's Birthday Honours list for services to equality and diversity and was ranked 36th in the OUTstanding top 100 LGBT executives in October 2018.

Early life
Isaac was born in Wales and attended King Henry VIII Grammar School in Abergavenny. He went on to study law at Trinity Hall, Cambridge and socio-legal studies at Wolfson College, Oxford. He attended the College of Law in Guildford to pass the Solicitors Final Examination (1979–80).

Pinsent Masons
Isaac was a partner at Pinsent Masons law firm from 2000 to 2021. He was Head of the firm's advanced manufacturing and technology sector from 2014 – 2019 and Chair of the Pinsent Masons' Diversity and Inclusion group.

Equality and Human Rights Commission
Isaac was appointed as Chair of the Equality and Human Rights Commission in 2016. He said that the Commission would use its legal powers more, do more for disability rights and make sure that human rights were protected during Brexit.

His tenure came to an end in August 2020, and his initial replacement was interim chair Caroline Waters (previously deputy chair).

In 2021 Isaac claimed that the Equality and Human Rights Commission was "being undermined by political pressure" by the Second Johnson ministry.

Stonewall
During his time as chair of Stonewall, the charity lobbied to secure legislative change, such as the abolition of Section 28 and the introduction of Civil Partnerships.

References

Provosts of Worcester College, Oxford
Alumni of Wolfson College, Oxford
Alumni of Trinity Hall, Cambridge
Commanders of the Order of the British Empire
People educated at King Henry VIII School, Abergavenny
Alumni of The University of Law
21st-century British lawyers
People associated with the University of the Arts London
LGBT lawyers
British LGBT businesspeople
Year of birth missing (living people)
Living people
21st-century LGBT people